Melvin Lowell Peterson (born March 23, 1938) is an American former National Basketball Association (NBA) and American Basketball Association (ABA) player.

Collegiate career
Mel attended Wheaton College. While at Wheaton College, Mel was selected as a three-time All-American basketball player.  He was also selected as the Most Outstanding Player of the 1957 NCAA Men's Division II basketball tournament, as Wheaton College won the inaugural NCAA Division II tournament.  Mel finished his career at Wheaton College, averaging 22.7 points and 15.8 rebounds per game. He still ranks as Wheaton College's all-time leader in points per game, career points, field goals made, and career rebounds.

Professional career
Mel was drafted with the fourth pick in the 11th round of the 1960 NBA draft by the Detroit Pistons. On August 15, 1963, Mel signed as a free agent with the Baltimore Bullets. In two games with the Bullets, Mel recorded a total of two points and one rebound. Peterson did not play for the following three seasons. Mel made his ABA debut on October 13, 1967, for the Oakland Oaks.

References

1938 births
Living people
American men's basketball players
Baltimore Bullets (1963–1973) players
Basketball players at the 1963 Pan American Games
Basketball players from Minnesota
Detroit Pistons draft picks
Los Angeles Stars players
Medalists at the 1963 Pan American Games
Oakland Oaks players
Pan American Games gold medalists for the United States
Pan American Games medalists in basketball
People from Thief River Falls, Minnesota
Shooting guards
Small forwards
United States men's national basketball team players
Wheaton Thunder men's basketball players
Wilmington Blue Bombers players
1963 FIBA World Championship players